City of Champaign v. Madigan, 2013 IL App (4th) 120662, 992 N.E.2d 629 (2013), is a case decided by the Illinois Appellate Court in 2013 concerning the state's Freedom of Information Act (FOIA). The court ruled that messages sent and received by elected officials during a city council meeting are subject to public disclosure, even when those communications are stored on personal electronic devices. The case addressed a public records request from a reporter for The News-Gazette in Champaign, Illinois, who observed Champaign city council members and the mayor using their personal electronic devices to send messages, outside the public's view, during a city council meeting. 

After city officials denied the reporter's request for the private messages, the reporter requested administrative review by the Public Access Counselor, part of the office of the Attorney General. The Attorney General's office, led by Lisa Madigan, issued a binding opinion, finding that records pertaining to the transaction of public business are subject to disclosure under FOIA, even if they are stored on an official's personal electronic device or account. On appeal, the Appellate Court upheld the Attorney General's opinion, but on more limited grounds, finding that officials would have to disclose their records only when acting as a "public body". The court found that members of a city council do not constitute a public body when acting individually. However, because the city council members in question had convened a public meeting, they were acting collectively as a public body, and their messages were therefore subject to disclosure under FOIA.

The court's decision left room for interpretation regarding the disclosure requirements for employees, rather than elected members, of a public body. This matter was clarified in subsequent litigation, including Public Access Opinion 16-006, which found that emails of employees are subject to disclosure if they pertain to public business, regardless of whether they are stored on personal devices. The General Assembly has considered legislation to clarify the disclosure requirements under FOIA concerning private devices, but the bills have expired.

Background 
Patrick Wade, a reporter for The News-Gazette in Champaign, Illinois, observed members of the Champaign city council and the mayor using their personal electronic devices to send messages during a public meeting. Curious about the contents of their private discussions, Wade filed a Freedom of Information Act (FOIA) request to the city on July 15, 2011, for the following records:
City officials provided Wade with records held by the city or its subsidiary public bodies. However, it denied his request for records from personal devices, responding that "private citizen’s communications to the Council member’s or the Mayor’s privately owned electronic devices is not within the scope of the Freedom of Information Act." An attorney for the city also advised that the Appellate Court had previously held, in Quinn v. Stone, that only a public body is subject to FOIA, not individual public officials such as the mayor or city council members.

On August 1, 2011, Wade requested administrative review with the Public Access Counselor, an attorney in the office of the Illinois Attorney General who is responsible for enforcing FOIA. Wade maintained that the requested records, even when privately held, are subject to disclosure because the officials were each communicating "in their role as a member of that public body during an ongoing public meeting".

Attorney General opinion 

The Attorney General's office, led by Lisa Madigan, issued a binding opinion titled "Public Access Opinion 11-006" on November 15, 2011. The Attorney General ruled that electronic communications, whether on publicly or privately-owned devices, may be subject to disclosure under FOIA.

The opinion referred to FOIA's definition of "public records", which includes documents "pertaining to the transaction of public business, regardless of physical form or characteristics, having been prepared by or for, or having been or being used by, received by, in the possession of, or under the control of any public body". The Attorney General concluded that the city was narrowly focused on the phrase "in the possession of" when determining whether the requested communications were subject to disclosure. When construing FOIA as a whole, the opinion concluded that records "in the possession of" the city are only one type of public record. The opinion further added: "Whether information is a 'public record' is not determined by where, how, or on what device that record was created; rather the question is whether that record was prepared by or used by one or more members of a public body in conducting the affairs of government." The key factor in determining what constitutes a "public record" is whether the record relates to "public business".

The Attorney General also rejected the city's reliance on Quinn. In Quinn, the Appellate Court determined that a FOIA request cannot be directed at an individual official, but rather must be submitted to a public body. Here, the opinion concluded that it is consistent with the court's ruling in Quinn, by finding that the communications of city officials are not records of the officials themselves, but rather the city.

Lastly, the city raised concerns that disclosure of private information could potentially implicate First Amendment rights. However, the opinion stated that records needed to be produced only when they relate to public business, and there was no evidence that such disclosure would violate the First Amendment. Family matters, political business, and other personal issues would not be subject to disclosure.

Court opinion 
The city appealed the Attorney General's opinion to the circuit court of Sangamon County, which affirmed the decision in June 2012. The city then appealed to the Fourth District of the Appellate Court later that summer. On July 16, 2013, the Appellate Court upheld the opinion that the messages were public records, but on more limited grounds. The court's opinion was written by Justice Carol Pope. Justices Thomas R. Appleton and Lisa Holder White, the other members of the appellate panel for this matter, agreed to Pope's opinion.

First, the court clarified that messages concerning personal matters were not subject to disclosure, since FOIA addresses only records "pertaining to the transaction of public business". Communications relating to community interests, rather than private affairs, constitute "public records" under FOIA. The city admitted that some of the communications related to this case were related to public business.  

The court found that members of a city council do not constitute a "public body" when acting individually. Rather, they act as a collective body, after convening a meeting with the other members of the city council. By this interpretation, if a constituent sends a message to a city council member at home on their personal device, that message would not be subject to FOIA even if it pertains to public business. On the other hand, if the message was created during a council meeting, then it would also be subject to FOIA because the members were acting collectively as a public body.

Additionally, the court noted that a quorum of individual members constitutes a public body, since a quorum can make binding decisions. Therefore, a communication would become a record of the public body if it were forwarded or sent to enough members to establish a quorum. Lastly, the record may also become subject to disclosure when forwarded or sent to a government-owned account. Because Wade's FOIA request was narrowly tailored to records created during city council meetings, the court did not have to consider other tangential issues.

The court's decision was the first in Illinois to find that private messages were subject to disclosure under FOIA, reflecting a growing consensus interpreting freedom of information laws elsewhere in the United States. The city announced that it intended to comply with the court's ruling, noting that there were "very few documents"  to release. It did not plan to appeal the case any further.

Reactions and subsequent developments 
Illinois Policy praised the ruling as "a victory for increased transparency in government", noting that the Open Meetings Act also requires transparency on what takes place during public meetings. Frank LoMonte, of the Student Press Law Center, regarded the court's decision as "a positive step for accountability", but noted that its effects are meaningful only if public officials follow retention guidelines for any government-related messages on their personal devices. 

Because of the ambiguity in FOIA, the court recommended that the General Assembly expressly amend FOIA if it intended messages stored on personal devices to be subject to disclosure. It also urged local governments to enact their own rules prohibiting city council members from using their personal devices during public meetings. Legal experts noted that the ruling's implications on local governments remain uncertain. John M. O'Driscoll, a local government attorney, advised public bodies throughout Illinois to review their practices and ordinances to minimize their risk of having to disclose communications intended to remain private. He also urged public officials to refrain from using their phones during public meetings, but this advice may prove difficult to enforce as officials heavily rely on their personal devices. O'Driscoll said that responding to FOIA requests for electronic communications remains difficult, and subsequent scenarios may be addressed by future litigation on a case-by-case basis.

The court's decision left room for interpretation in other contexts. The disclosure requirements for aldermen was limited because a city council technically is not acting as a public body until it has convened a meeting to conduct its business. Regarding employees (rather than elected members) of the public body, the applicability of City of Champaign was unclear, as a legal expert noted that "executive branch employees" act on the public body's behalf. In May 2016, the Circuit Court of Cook County clarified the matter when it ruled that personal emails of Chicago Mayor Rahm Emanuel may be subject to disclosure, even when stored on private devices. Later that year, the Attorney General's office revisited this issue by issuing Public Access Opinion 16-006, deciding that officers of the Chicago Police Department were required to release their private emails about the police-involved murder of Laquan McDonald. Journalists also pointed towards similar public access issues during the administration of Illinois Governor Bruce Rauner and the Hillary Clinton email controversy. In 2020, the First District of the Appellate Court ordered the release of correspondence held on private devices of several Chicago officials, including the mayor, his staff, and the public health commissioner. In that ruling, the court noted that City of Champaign held “that personal communications are at least sometimes public records”.

In 2017, the General Assembly considered two bills, which appeared to be in response to City of Champaign and Public Access Opinion 16-006. One bill would have made it more difficult to obtain records not already in the control of a public body. Another bill would have amended the Local Records Act to explicitly state that all emails sent or received by government officials and employees are public records "regardless of whether the email is sent or received on a personal or agency-provided email address". The bill also would have required public officials and employees to use government-issued email addresses, and forward any emails related to public business on personal accounts to their governmental accounts. Both bills expired in January 2019.

Notes

References

External links 
Full text of Public Access Opinion 11-006
Full text of the Appellate Court's opinion

Illinois state case law
Freedom of information in the United States